Achiote is a barrio in the municipality of Naranjito, Puerto Rico. Its population in 2010 was 3,919.

Description
Achiote is in northcentral Naranjito. According to the 2010 Census, Achiote had a total area of  including  of water. In 2010, its population was 3,919. Coleen Vázquez school is in Achiote.

History
Puerto Rico was ceded by Spain in the aftermath of the Spanish–American War under the terms of the Treaty of Paris of 1898 and became an unincorporated territory of the United States. In 1899, the United States Department of War conducted a census of Puerto Rico in 1899 finding that the population of Achiote barrio was 1,094.

Sectors
Barrios (which are roughly comparable to minor civil divisions) in turn are further subdivided into smaller local populated place areas/units called sectores (sectors in English). The types of sectores may vary, from normally sector to urbanización to reparto to barriada to residencial, among others.

The following sectors are in Achiote barrio:

Notable people from Achiote
Aryam Díaz from Achiote was selected to represent Puerto Rico in the Miss World 2021 pageant.

Gallery

See also

 List of communities in Puerto Rico
 List of barrios and sectors of Naranjito, Puerto Rico

References

Barrios of Naranjito, Puerto Rico